Hydrophis belcheri, commonly known as the faint-banded sea snake or Belcher's sea snake, is an extremely venomous species of elapid sea snake. It has a timid temperament and would normally have to be subjected to severe mistreatment before biting.  Usually those bitten are fishermen handling nets, although only one-quarter of those bitten are envenomated since the snake rarely injects much of its venom. 
Although not much is known about the venom of this species, its LD50 toxicity in mice has been determined to be 0.24 mg/kg when delivered intramuscularly.

Belcher's sea snake, which many times is mistakenly called the hook-nosed sea snake (Enhydrina schistosa), has been erroneously popularized as the most venomous snake in the world, due to Ernst and Zug's published book Snakes in Question: The Smithsonian Answer Book from 1996.
Associate Professor Bryan Grieg Fry, a prominent venom expert, has clarified the error: "The hook nosed myth was due to a fundamental error in a book called 'Snakes in question'. In there, all the toxicity testing results were lumped in together, regardless of the mode of testing (e.g. subcutaneous vs. intramuscular vs intravenous vs intraperitoneal). As the mode can influence the relative number, venoms can only be compared within a mode. Otherwise, its apples and rocks.". Studies on mice<ref name="Dr. Bryan Grieg Fry - Interview">Inland Taipan Venom vs. Sea Snakes Venom (most notable Belcher's sea snake) 
 Oakley, Cecily (2011). Interview with Associate Professor Bryan Fry Biochemist and molecular biologist . "...For my PhD, I worked on the inland taipan, which is the world’s most venomous snake..." . Australian Academy of Science. Retrieved October 14, 2013.
 kingsnake.com September Guest Chatter (September 16, 2006).Q&A with Dr. Bryan Grieg Fry, Deputy Director, Australian Venom Research Unit, University of Melbourne . "Q: In retrospect to the LD50 charts, what do you personally feel is the hottest snake, in regards to potency, defensiveness, means of injection, etc.? A: It is the inland taipan (Oxyuranus microlepidotus). Not, as is popularised, any of the sea snakes."  connectedbypets.com. Retrieved October 14, 2013.  
 Garden of Eden Exotics (May 2, 2012) Dr. Bryan Grieg Fry – Interview "...The inland taipan (Oxyuranus microlepidotus') is far and away the most toxic, much more so than even sea snakes."  nyexotics.blogspot.com Retrieved October 14, 2013</ref>  and human cardiac cell cultureSeymour, Jamie, World's Worst Venom, (Min 44.33) "Among the reptiles tested, the most toxic venom belongs to inland taipan, killing over 60% of heart cells in the first 10 minutes"  National Geographic Channel Retrieved April 17, 2014 shows that venom of the inland taipan, drop by drop, is the most toxic among all snakes; land or sea. The most venomous sea snake is actually Dubois' seasnake (Aipysurus duboisii).

Description
The belcher's sea snake is of moderate size, ranging from 0.5 to 1 meter (about 20–40 inches) in adult length. Its thin body is usually chrome yellowish in colour with dark greenish crossbands. The dorsal pattern does not extend onto the venter. The head is short and has bands of the same colours. Its mouth is very small but suitable for aquatic life. Its body, when viewed out of water, appears to have a faint yellow colour. Its scales are different from most other snakes in that they overlap each other. Each dorsal scale has a central tubercle. The body is strongly laterally compressed posteriorly. The ventral scales are very narrow, only slightly wider than the dorsal scales.

Taxonomic history
This species was first described and named by John Edward Gray in 1849.

EtymologyHydrophis comes from Greek ὕδωρ, hydōr = water + ὄφις, ophis = serpent.

The specific name, belcheri, commemorates the Nova Scotian, Royal Navy Captain, later Admiral, Sir Edward Belcher KCB, RN (1799-1877) who collected the holotype.

Common namesH. belcheri is also referred to as Belcher's ocean snake. Belcher's sea snake has been mistakenly called the "hook-nosed sea snake" (which is actually Enhydrina schistosa) and in one instance was called the "blue-banded sea snake" (which is actually one common name for Hydrophis cyanocinctus).

References

 External links 
Todo sobre la serpiente marina Blecher

Further reading
Boulenger GA (1896). Catalogue of the Snakes in the British Museum (Natural History). Volume III., Containing the Colubridæ (Opisthoglyphæ and Proteroglyphæ), ... London: Trustees of the British Museum (Natural History). (Taylor and Francis, printers). xiv + 727 pp. + Plates I- XXV. (Distira belcheri, pp. 296–297 + Plate XVII, Figure 2).
Gray JE (1849). Catalogue of the Specimens of Snakes in the Collection of the British Museum. London: Trustees of the British Museum. (Edward Newman, printer). xv + 125 pp. (Aturia belcheri, new species, p. 46).
McCarthy CJ, Warrel DA (1991). "A collection of sea snakes from Thailand with new records of Hydrophis belcheri (Gray)". Bull. British Mus. Nat. Hist. (Zool.) 57 (2): 161-166.
McCoy M (2000). Reptiles of the Solomon Islands''. Kuranda, Australia: ZooGraphics. CD-ROM.

belcheri
Reptiles described in 1849
Taxa named by John Edward Gray
Snakes of Australia